Meslila is a settlement in the commune of Ouled Khoudir, in Ouled Khoudir District, Béchar Province, Algeria. The settlement is surrounded by the dunes of the Grand Erg Occidental.

References

Neighbouring towns and cities

Populated places in Béchar Province